Knetzgau is a municipality in the district of Haßberge in Bavaria in Germany.  It consists of eight villages: Oberschwappach, Unterschwappach, Westheim, Hainert, Eschenau, Neuhaus, Zell am Ebersberg, Wohnau and Zeil.

References

Haßberge (district)